Marko Janković (born 15 January 1988) is a Serbian former football goalkeeper.

Early career
Born in Valjevo, he began his career in his native Serbia playing for FK Sopot. In 2013, he moved to Novi Pazar and played for the first time in Serbian SuperLiga, making his debut against FK Crvena Zvezda.

External links
  at Srbijafudbal.

References

Living people
1988 births
Sportspeople from Valjevo
Serbian footballers
Association football goalkeepers
Serbian SuperLiga players
FK Novi Pazar players
FK Bežanija players
OFK Mladenovac players